This list ranks South Carolina buildings that stand at least 250 feet (76 m) tall, based on standard height measurement. This includes spires and architectural details but does not include antenna masts or other objects not part of the original plans. Existing structures are included for ranking purposes based on present height. The tallest structure in the state is an uninhabitable tower in Abbeville County. Since the structure is not classified as a building, however, it is not included on this list.

Tallest buildings

See also
List of tallest buildings in the United States
List of tallest buildings by U.S. state

References

Tallest
South Carolina